Parsonsburg is an unincorporated community and census-designated place in Wicomico County, Maryland, United States. Its population was 339 as of the 2010 census. It is part of the Salisbury, Maryland-Delaware Metropolitan Statistical Area.

Demographics

Climate
The climate in this area is characterized by hot, humid summers and generally mild to cool winters.  According to the Köppen climate classification system, Parsonsburg has a humid subtropical climate, abbreviated "Cfa" on climate maps.

Notable person

 Maulana Karenga

References

Census-designated places in Wicomico County, Maryland
Census-designated places in Maryland
Salisbury metropolitan area